Brazil's first female state governor was Roseana Sarney, elected in 1994 (and re-elected in 1998) as the chief executive of the state of Maranhão, representing the Brazilian Democratic Movement Party (PMDB). Other women have held governorships since then, either elected in their own right or appointed on an interim basis.

Female governors
Acre
Iolanda Fleming, 1986 – March 15, 1987
Amapá
Dalva Figueiredo, April 5, 2002 – January 1, 2003
Distrito Federal
Maria de Lourdes Abadia,  March 15, 2006 – January 1, 2007
Maranhão
Roseana Sarney, PMDB, January 1, 1995 – April 6, 2002 and April 17, 2009 – December 10, 2014
Pará
Ana Julia Carepa, PT, January 1, 2007 – December 31, 2010
Pernambuco
Beatriz de Albuquerque, April 18, 1553 – July 30, 1553
Maria Margarida de Castro e Albuquerque, September 24, 1658 – October 25, 1689
Rio Grande do Norte
Wilma de Faria, PSB, January 1, 2003 – March 31, 2010
Rosalba Ciarlini, DEM, January 1, 2011 – January 1, 2015
Fátima Bezerra, PT, January 1, 2019 – incumbent
Rio Grande do Sul
Yeda Crusius, PSDB, January 1, 2007 – December 31, 2010
Rio de Janeiro
Benedita da Silva, PT,  April 5, 2002 – January 1, 2003
Rosinha Garotinho, PMDB, January 1, 2003 – January 1, 2007

References 

Brasil terá número recorde de governadoras Terra, 30 October 2006

See also
States of Brazil

Brazil

Female
Governors
List